Beri is a village in Piparali panchayat samiti and sikar tehsil in Sikar district of Rajasthan state in India. It is located at a distance of 21 km north of sikar. Beri is also known as Beri Bajangarh due to an old fort called Bhajangarh.Beri has the border of sikar and jhunjhunu district.

References

Villages in Sikar district